Kanisha Jimenez (born 28 November 1995) is a Puerto Rican female volleyball player.
She participated in the 2013 FIVB World Grand Prix.

She played high school volleyball at Academia Discipulos de Cristo in Bayamón, Puerto Rico. Later played for University of Tennessee.

References

External links 
 player info FIVB
 http://www.utdailybeacon.com/news/campus_life/catching-up-on-puerto-rico-puerto-rican-students-feel-effects/article_6e009a74-add7-11e7-b816-db35dbe5ac02.html

1995 births
Living people
Puerto Rican women's volleyball players
People from Toa Baja, Puerto Rico
Tennessee Volunteers women's volleyball players